"Beating My Heart" is a song by American singer and songwriter Jon McLaughlin. It was released on June 17, 2008, through The Island Def Jam Music Group as the lead and only single from his sophomore album, OK Now (2008).

Critical reception
Chuck Taylor of Billboard praised the song, saying "[Beating My Heart] is a joyous uptempo romantic romp, featuring hook after hook, from tinkling piano to driving percussion and a start-and-stop bridge, alongside a joyous effortless vocal that soars with falsetto to the high heavens."

Music video
The music video was shot in Malibu, California. It was directed by Ryan Travis and was released on July 7, 2008.

Track listing

Charts

Release history

References

2008 singles
2008 songs
Island Records singles